Miaenia tonkinensis is a species of beetle in the family Cerambycidae. It was described by Pic in 1944.

References

Miaenia
Beetles described in 1944